HLF may refer to:

 HLF (gene), Hepatic Leukemia Factor - a human gene and the protein encoded by it
 Hapag-Lloyd Flug, former German airline, ICAO code
 Herbalife, US MLM company, NYSE symbol
 Heritage Lottery Fund, a British grant-giving organisation
 Hillfoot railway station, in Scotland
 Hiram Leong Fong, former United States Senator from Hawaii
 Histoire littéraire de la France, a history of French literature
 Holy Land Foundation for Relief and Development, an American Islamic charity
 Huddersfield Literature Festival, in England
 Hultsfred Airport, in Sweden
 Hyderabad Literary Festival, in India